Dato'  Mohammed Bakar (or Mohamad Bakar) (25 June 1945 – 8 November 2020) was a Malaysian footballer.
He was also the flag bearer for Malaysia at the 1972 Summer Olympics.

Career
A teacher by profession (as Malaysia football is not professional in his time), Mohamed represented Penang FA during his football career. Mohamed competed for the Malaysia national team in the men's tournament at the 1972 Summer Olympics and came as substitute to replaced Shaharuddin Abdullah in the 3-0 won against United States.

He was also in the coaching staff when Malaysia qualified again for the 1980 Olympics, though the Olympics were later boycotted by Malaysia. He was earlier the team head coach when Malaysia won the 1979 Southeast Asian Games gold medal, but the Football Association of Malaysia recorded Karl-Heinz Weigang, who was then the national team advisor, as the winning head coach. Later, he was the Malaysia head coach for the ill-fated 1986 FIFA World Cup qualification in 1985.

In 2004, he was inducted in Olympic Council of Malaysia's Hall of Fame for 1972 Summer Olympics football team and also awarded Maal Hijrah Sports Figure by Penang Malay Association. On 8 November 2020, Datuk Mohamad Bakar died at the Universiti Sains Malaysia Advanced Medical and Dental Institute (IPPT), Kepala Batas. He was 75.

Honours
 Player
 Bronze medal Asian Games: 1974
 Merdeka Cup: 1973, 1974
 Burnley Cup: 1964/65
 Malaysia Kings Gold Cup: 1966, 1968, 1969
 Malaysia Cup: 1974
 Aga Khan Gold Cup: 1976

Coaching staff
Gold medal SEA Games: 1979

Head coach
Merdeka Cup: 1979
Bronze medal SEA Games: 1985

Orders

  Member of the Order of the Defender of the Realm (A.M.N.) (1978)
  Officer of the Order of the Defender of State (DSPN) – Dato’

See also
 List of flag bearers for Malaysia at the Olympics

References

External links
 

1945 births
2020 deaths
Malaysian footballers
Malaysia international footballers
Olympic footballers of Malaysia
Footballers at the 1972 Summer Olympics
Place of birth missing
Association football wingers
Medalists at the 1974 Asian Games
Footballers at the 1974 Asian Games
Asian Games bronze medalists for Malaysia
Asian Games medalists in football